The Ukrainian Jewish Committee is a Kyiv-based organization representing Ukrainian Jews. Its director general is Eduard Dolinsky, and its president is the Ukrainian MP Oleksandr Feldman.

In April 2017, Eduard Dolinsky, leader of the Ukrainian Jewish Committee, expressed concern about the "whitewashing" of the nazi past of some Ukrainian nationalists

References 

Jewish organizations based in Ukraine
Organizations based in Kyiv